Janja Šegel (born 17 June 2001) is a Slovenian swimmer. She competed on the Slovenian team in the women's 4 × 200 metre freestyle relay event at the 2016 Summer Olympics.

References

2001 births
Living people
Slovenian female swimmers
Olympic swimmers of Slovenia
Swimmers at the 2016 Summer Olympics
Slovenian female freestyle swimmers
Swimmers at the 2020 Summer Olympics
Mediterranean Games medalists in swimming
Mediterranean Games gold medalists for Slovenia
Mediterranean Games silver medalists for Slovenia
Swimmers at the 2022 Mediterranean Games
21st-century Slovenian women